Pumalín Airport is an airport on Isla Llahuen, the easternmost of the islands separating the Gulf of Ancud from the Gulf of Corcovado.

Approach and departures are over the water.

See also

Transport in Chile
List of airports in Chile

References

External links
OpenStreetMap - Pumalín
OurAirports - Pumalín
FallingRain - Pumalín Airport

Airports in Los Lagos Region